Mount Phoukas or Foukas is a mountain in the Peloponnesus in Greece. Anciently, it was called Apesas; it towered above Nemea in the territory of Cleonae, Argolis, and was where Perseus is said to have been the first person who sacrificed to Zeus Apesantius.

References

Phoukas
Locations in Greek mythology
Landforms of Argolis